"Cuando Te Besé" is a song by American singer Becky G and Argentine rapper and singer Paulo Londra. Released by Sony Music Latin on August 2, 2018, it was written by Londra, Jairo Bascope, Cristian Salazar and Daniel Echavarría Oviedo. 
Among the successes of "Cuando Te Besé" in the charts is being the first song to top the Billboard Argentina Hot 100 chart.

Charts

Weekly charts

Year-end charts

Certifications

See also
 List of airplay number-one hits of the 2010s (Argentina)
 List of Billboard Argentina Hot 100 number-one singles of 2018

References

2018 singles
2018 songs
Becky G songs
Paulo Londra songs
Sony Music Latin singles
Reggaeton songs
Male–female vocal duets
Spanish-language songs
Argentina Hot 100 number-one singles
Song recordings produced by Ovy on the Drums